The Haitian Amateur Athletic Federation (FHAA) is the governing body for the sport of athletics in Haïti.  Current president is Alain Jean Pierre.

History 
FHAA was founded in 1969 and was affiliated to the IAAF in 1970.

Affiliations 
FHAA is the national member federation for Haïti in the following international organisations:
International Association of Athletics Federations (IAAF)
North American, Central American and Caribbean Athletic Association (NACAC)
Association of Panamerican Athletics (APA)
Central American and Caribbean Athletic Confederation (CACAC)
Moreover, it is part of the following national organisations:
Haitian Olympic Committee (COH; Comité Olympique Haïtien)

National records 
FHAA maintains the Haitian records in athletics.

References 

Haiti
Athletics
National governing bodies for athletics
Sports organizations established in 1969